Naked Dinner is the third solo album by American hip hop musician Time. It was released on August 25, 2009 on Dirty Laboratory Productions in association with Hip Hop Vinyl.  It features guest appearances from C-Rayz Walz and Sole. In early 2010, Naked Dinner charted at #19 in the nation on the CMJ hip-hop charts.

Track listing

References

External links
 

2009 albums
Time (rapper) albums